Robert Daniel (1936–2012) was a Virginia farmer, businessman, teacher, and politician.

Robert Daniel may also refer to:
 Robert Hugh Daniel (1906–1983), chairman and CEO of Daniel International Corporation
 Robert Mackenzie Daniel (1813–1847), Scottish journalist and novelist
 Robert Prentiss Daniel (1902–1968), African-American psychologist, scholar, and college administrator
 Robert Williams Daniel (1884–1940), American banker who survived the sinking of the RMS Titanic

See also
 Robert Daniell (1646–1718)
 Robert Daniels (disambiguation)